Leopold Feldmann (22 May 1802, in Munich, Bavaria – 26 March 1882, in Vienna) was a German-Austrian dramatist.

Biography
In 1835 appeared his Lays of Hell. Next came the comedy The Son on His Travels, which made a brilliant success at Munich. After five years in travel, chiefly in Greece, as correspondent of the Allgemeine Zeitung, in 1850 he settled in Vienna for life.

Works
His comedies were very popular in their day. Among them are:
 Free Choice
 Sweetheart's Portrait
 The Late Countess
 The Comptroller and His Daughter

Notes

References

1802 births
1882 deaths
19th-century Austrian dramatists and playwrights
German male dramatists and playwrights
Austrian male dramatists and playwrights
19th-century German dramatists and playwrights
19th-century German male writers